Michal Jáně (born 8 July 1986) is a Czech slalom canoeist who has competed at the international level since 2002.

He won two medals in the C1 team event at the ICF Canoe Slalom World Championships with a silver in 2014 and a bronze in 2010. He also won two silver medals in the same event at the European Championships.

His younger brother Jakub is also a slalom canoeist.

World Cup individual podiums

References

External links
 

Czech male canoeists
Living people
1986 births
Medalists at the ICF Canoe Slalom World Championships